Rich Hill Township is one of the twenty-five townships of Muskingum County, Ohio, United States.  The 2000 census found 385 people in the township.

Geography
Located on the eastern edge of the county, it borders the following townships:
Union Township - north
Westland Township, Guernsey County - northeast
Spencer Township, Guernsey County - east
Brookfield Township, Noble County - southeast corner
Meigs Township - south
Blue Rock Township - southwest corner
Salt Creek Township - west

No municipalities are located in Rich Hill Township.

Name and history
Rich Hill Township was established in 1815. It is the only Rich Hill Township statewide.

Government
The township is governed by a three-member board of trustees, who are elected in November of odd-numbered years to a four-year term beginning on the following January 1. Two are elected in the year after the presidential election and one is elected in the year before it. There is also an elected township fiscal officer, who serves a four-year term beginning on April 1 of the year after the election, which is held in November of the year before the presidential election. Vacancies in the fiscal officership or on the board of trustees are filled by the remaining trustees.

References

External links
County website

Townships in Muskingum County, Ohio
Townships in Ohio